Hertha Ernestine Pauli (September 4, 1906 – February 9, 1973) was an Austrian journalist, writer and actress.

Biography

Hertha Ernestine Pauli was born in Vienna, the daughter of feminist Bertha Schütz and chemist Wolfgang Pauli. Her brother was Wolfgang Pauli, who was awarded the Nobel Prize in Physics in 1945.

From 1927-33, she played different small roles at the Max Reinhardt Theatre in Berlin and was allied with Ödön von Horváth. From 1933-38, she lived in Vienna, edited the "Österreichische Korrespondenz" and published biographical novels, for example about the feminist Bertha von Suttner.

After the Anschluss, she immigrated to France. In Paris, she belonged to the circle of Joseph Roth, knew the American journalist Eric Sevareid, and wrote for Resistance. In 1940, after the Nazis occupied France, she fled with writer Walter Mehring through Marseilles, the Pyrenees and Lisbon. With the aid of Varian Fry and the Emergency Rescue Committee, she made her way to the United States.

After her arrival in the U.S., she described her flight in the journal Aufbau. 

In the following years she wrote books about Alfred Nobel and the Statue of Liberty. Her books for children, in particular, had some success. These books included Silent Night. The Story of a Song (1943), in which she explained the origin of the carol. 

She married Ernst Basch (pen name, E.B. Ashton), with whom she had collaborated on I Lift My Lamp. Her last book was autobiographical and described the time after the Nazi's union with France.

Death
She died in Bay Shore, New York on February 9, 1973, aged 66.

Works 
 Toni. Ein Frauenleben für Ferdinand Raimund, 1936
 Nur eine Frau. Bertha von Suttner, 1937
 Alfred Nobel, Dynamite King, Architect of Peace, 1942 
 Silent Night. The Story of a Song, 1943
 Story of the Christmas Tree, 1944
 St. Nicholas Travels, 1946
 I Lift my Lamp, The Way of a Symbol, 1948
 The Golden Door, 1949
 Three Is a Family, 1955
 Bernadette and the Lady, 1956
 Her Name Was Sojourner Truth, 1962 
 The Secret of Sarajevo: The Story of Franz Ferdinand and Sophie, 1966 
 Break of Time, 1972

References

Bibliography 
 Between Sorrow and Strength: Women Refugees of the Nazi Period, edited by Sibylle Quack, David Lazar, Christof Mauch. Cambridge University Press, 2002.
 Marino, Andy, American Pimpernel: The Man who Saved the Artists on Hitler's Death List. Hutchinson, 1999.
 Pfanner, Helmut F., Exile in New York: German and Austrian Writers After 1933. Wayne State University Press, 1983.
 Stern, Guy, 'Hertha Pauli'. In: Stern, Guy, Literatur im Exil, Bd.2. Ismaning 1989.

External links 

 "Eine Brücke über den Riss der Zeit...". Das Leben und Wirken der Journalistin und Schriftstellerin Hertha Pauli
 The German and Jewish intellectual émigré collection of the university at Albany: (The German and Jewish intellectual émigré collection)
 
 Hertha Pauli (in German) from the archive of the Österreichische Mediathek

1906 births
1973 deaths
Jewish emigrants from Austria to the United States after the Anschluss
Austrian women novelists
Austrian stage actresses
Journalists from Vienna
20th-century women writers
20th-century Austrian novelists
20th-century Austrian actresses